Lenin in Paris is a Soviet biopic directed by Sergei Yutkevich in 1981 on Mosfilm.

Synopsis
Russian revolutionary Vladimir Lenin spent four years in Paris (1909–1912), and this historical docudrama explores those years with a certain amount of humor. Lenin is shown visiting with friends, the meetings with his later mistress Inessa Armand (in the movie she is in love with a young communist, Trofimov), while several of his philosophical views and economic and political theories are mouthed by a former colleague who narrates the film and brings the material into the present.

Cast
Yuri Kayurov as Vladimir Lenin
Claude Jade as Inessa Armand
Vladimir Antonik as Aleksandr Trofimov
Valentina Svetlova as Nadezhda Krupskaya
Pavel Kadochnikov as Paul Lafargue
Antonina Maksimova as Laura Lafargue
Boris Ivanov as Jacob Zhitomirsky
Sergei Pozharsky as Montéhus
Albert Filozov as leader of the anarchists
Yelena Koreneva as singer at Montéhus (singing voice by Carolyn Claire)
Galina Belyayeva as student
Sergei Prokhanov as courier
Anatoly Adoskin as agitator-menshevik
Olegar Fedoro as Montmarte painter

External links

Artikel zum Film Lenin in Paris
Original Movieposter "Lenin in Paris"

1980s biographical drama films
Soviet biographical drama films
Russian biographical drama films
1980s Russian-language films
Mosfilm films
Films about communism
Films set in Paris
Films directed by Sergei Yutkevich
Films about Vladimir Lenin
1981 drama films
1981 films
Films set in 1909
Films set in 1910
Films set in 1911
Films set in 1912